Deleanu is a Romanian surname that may refer to:

 Augustin Deleanu, Romanian footballer
 Irina Deleanu, Romanian rhythmic gymnast
 Liviu Deleanu, Moldovan and Romanian poet and playwright

See also 
 Dealu (disambiguation)
 Deleni (disambiguation)
 Delureni (disambiguation)

Romanian-language surnames